Hamster & Gretel is an American animated comedy television series created by Dan Povenmire that premiered on Disney Channel on August 12, 2022. In January 2023, the series was renewed for a second season.

Plot
A 16-year-old boy named Kevin must work with his sister Gretel when she and her pet hamster are given superpowers by aliens and become a superhero duo dedicated to protecting their city.

Characters

Main
 Gretel Grant-Gomez (voiced by Meli Povenmire) - Kevin's excitable younger sister who gains superpowers and becomes a superheroine. While she means well, Gretel has a tendency to make problems worse by using brute force.
 Kevin Grant-Gomez (voiced by Michael Cimino) - A 16-year-old boy and Gretel's older brother who tries to support Hamster and Gretel in being superheroes. He is the brains due to his quick-thinking skills being able to solve problems in dire moments.
 Hamster (voiced by Beck Bennett) - Kevin and Gretel's stoic pet hamster who gets superpowers along with Gretel. He also gets the ability to speak, but generally does so in moments of comic relief.
 Winifred "Fred" Grant (voiced by Joey King) - Kevin and Gretel's deadpan, sarcastic, cynical, and tech-savvy cousin, who acts as the team's tech support. She also has gymnastic abilities, as seen in the episode "Cheer Cheer Bang Bang" when she went undercover as a cheerleader.
 Dave Grant-Gomez (voiced by Matt Jones) - Kevin and Gretel's father who works as a building manager at an apartment complex. He is physically based on series creator Dan Povenmire.
 Carolina Grant-Gomez (voiced by Carolina Ravassa) - Kevin and Gretel's eccentric yet wise Venezuelan mother who works as a nurse.

Recurring
 Bailey Carter (voiced by Priah Ferguson) - Gretel's best friend and also a fan of the superhero Gretel; she was unaware that they were the same person until the episode "My Invisible Friend", when she finally found out.
 Roman Carter (voiced by Michael-Leon Wooley) – Bailey's father who works as a video game producer.
 Nordle (voiced by Pamela Adlon) – A nerdy and wealthy boy in Gretel's class who is the son of Professor Exclamation, but has no interest in villainy. He has a friendly rivalry with Gretel, but is unaware of her superhero identity or her beef with his father.
 Veronica Hill (voiced by Liza Koshy) - A blunt, snarky news reporter who often weaves her personal issues into the current stories.
 Anthony (voiced by Akintoye) - Kevin's confident buddy.
 Hiromi Tanaka (voiced by Hiromi Dames) - A girl who works at a comic book store and is also Kevin's crush.
 Naya (voiced by Abby Espiritu) – The head cheerleader at Kevin and Fred's high school. A running gag involves her commenting on other characters' cartoonish disguises.
 Unseen aliens (voiced by Dan Povenmire and Joanna Hausmann) - The unseen entities that ride in a UFO and give superpowers to random strangers and items such as Hamster and Gretel, FistPuncher and The Destructress, La Cebolla, a bouncy castle, a leftover sloppy joe, and a scone.

Villains
 Professor Exclamation (voiced by Phil LaMarr) - A punctuation-themed supervillain who has short arms due to losing his elbows in a freak accident, and now wants to make the world bend to him.
 Lauren/The Destructress and Lyle/FistPuncher (voiced by Alyson Stoner and Brock Powell respectively) - Fraternal twins who had an encounter with the same aliens as Hamster and Gretel, granting them similar powers. Unlike the latter, they were told to use their powers for evil, becoming supervillains as a result. In the episode "The Bitter Sitter", it is revealed that Lauren has taken up a babysitting job in order to have a non-evil side hustle.
 El Luchador (voiced by Carlos Alazraqui) – A wrestler-themed supervillain who loves ropa vieja.
 Rodney Thunderpants (voiced by James Adomian) – A cowboy who has electrokinesis and a deep hatred of cellphones.
 Van Dyke (voiced by Casey Hamilton) – A sentient Van Dyke beard who can possess people by attaching himself to their faces.
 Coach Haggerty (voiced by Betsy Sodaro) – A cheerleading coach that hypnotizes people to commit crimes for her using her whistle. 
 La Cebolla (voiced by Karina La Voz) - A former telenovela star-turned-villainess who encountered the unseen aliens, granting her the ability to communicate with onions and onion-related plants.
 CopyCat (voiced by Eric Bauza) - A comic book geek with a huge trust fund and a degree in engineering who invents a super suit based on the comic book character "Man Cat." 
 Neighslayer (voiced by Thomas Sanders) - A former track star who was mutated into a half-horse half-man mutant after an experiment gone awry. This left him with horse hooves in place of his human arms and legs.
 Dr. Eelgood (voiced by Keith Ferguson) – A mad scientist who has sworn revenge on the local aquarium, and has genetically engineered a nearly indestructible eel. He was one of Dave's tenants, although he was evicted when his experiments were exposed.
 The X-terminator (voiced by John DiMaggio) – A supervillain who has a vendetta against rodents of all kinds after his human body was accidentally merged with his rat-catching device.
 The Amplifier (voiced by Khary Payton) – A supervillain with a ray gun that can dramatically increase the size of whatever it shoots.
 The Nightmarionette (voiced by Michael-Leon Wooley) – A villain who can create life-like projections of people's greatest fears.
 Bob Infantiburg/Big Baby (voiced by Brock Powell) – A former mayoral candidate and Veronica Hill's ex-boyfriend who accidentally turned himself into a kaiju-sized baby.
 Tina (voiced by Camryn Grimes) – A new student in Gretel and Bailey's class who turns out to be a spy from the country of Bolgylvania.
 The Earworm (voiced by Adam Rose) – A songwriting supervillain whose evil jingle hypnotizes Hamster and Gretel.
 The East Side Bantam (voiced by Cree Summer) – The former chicken-like school mascot that tries to sabotage every school play after being replaced by the East Side Plumber mascot. Her true identity is revealed to be Christine DuPoulet, who was said to have disappeared during the stage production of The Vikings of Venzance. In truth, she fled due to coming down with a severe case of stage fright and hid under the stage dressed as the East Side Bantam. After being thwarted by Gretel, who also suffered from stage fright, Christine became the new mascot of "Frank's Discounted Discount Costumes".
 The Imposter (voiced by Diedrich Bader) – A villain who wears multiple disguises.
 Ernie (voiced by Brock Powell) – A baker villain that attacks people with his "divorce cakes" after people refused to buy them.
 Belle (voiced by Karalynn Dunton) – A social media influencer who starts a smear campaign against Hamster and Gretel to increase her number of followers.
 Arthouse (voiced by Diedrich Bader) – A disgruntled film artist who produces mundane short films.
 Tchotchke Jones (voiced by Richard Kind) - A sinister tchotchke shop owner, who shrinks historical landmarks and puts them in bottles.
 Micromanager (voiced by John Hodgman) - The owner of Small Burger and a former employee of Tall Burger who got fired after he accidentally shrunk himself with a device meant to shrink onions and now wants to literally destroy his competition.
 Charlie/Father Goose (voiced by Isaac Robinson-Smith) – A man with goose wings on his rear end who wants to bring about the next step of human evolution by turning the populace into geese.
 Helen/Rat Burglar (voiced by Rachel Dratch) - A villain dressed as a rat, who uses "Invisible Ink" on herself to secretly help her son, Xavier, cheat in contests without getting caught.

Production

Development 
In October 2020, it was reported that Phineas and Ferb and Milo Murphy's Law co-creator Dan Povenmire was developing a new animated series with a 20-episode order for Disney Channel, titled Hamster & Gretel, with Disney Television Animation producing. Povenmire first pitched the show as an animatic in 2019, with him providing all the voices. The character of Hamster originated from a drawing he did on his sketchboard during development on the Disney+ film Phineas and Ferb the Movie: Candace Against the Universe (2020). It was later refined whilst Povenmire was on a vacation with his family in Aruba. The series marks Povenmire's first project as showrunner without Jeff "Swampy" Marsh, due to the latter developing projects of his own after creating his own studio. However, Marsh will still have a recurring voice role as various characters on the series.

In September 2021, Joanna Hausmann joined the series as its head writer, co-producer, and story editor. Povenmire approached her after listening to Haunsman talking about her experiences as a Venezuelan, as he felt she could bring authenticity to the series' Venezuelan representation. Povenmire has also stated that the show boasts ADHD representation, through Gretel.

In June 2022, it was announced that ten additional episodes had been ordered, bringing the total episode number to 30. On January 13, 2023, it was announced that the series was renewed for a second season, as part of an overall deal between Povenmire and Disney Branded Television.

Writing 
Writing for Hamster & Gretel began by October 2020. It was done remotely due to Disney TVA's closure during the COVID-19 pandemic. The series was based on Povenmire's dynamic with his much younger sister, which he felt had never been portrayed on TV before; director Amber T. Hollinger described the relationship between Kevin and Gretel as the series' main focus, with the Kevin's arc centering on his role as an older brother after Gretel receives her powers. Povenmire also drew inspiration from his family for the characters Kevin and Gretel. The series features Venezuelan lead characters; this was inspired by both Hausmann and Povenmire's wife being Venezuelan. The series also incorporated several Venezuelan easter eggs.

The series is set in the same universe as Phineas and Ferb and Milo Murphy's Law, with characters from both shows making cameos throughout Hamster and Gretel. However, Povenmire noted there were no plans for a formal crossover in the series, unlike Milo Murphy's Law.

Animation 
Snipple Animation and Synergy Animation both provide animation services for the series; work on the first episodes finished by May 2022. Episodes are produced simultaneously at different stages, with some in pre-production and others in post-production. The series will feature action sequences that have more cinematic quality than Phineas and Ferb and Milo Murphy's Law.

Music 

Similar to his previous work, Povenmire wrote songs for the series. The soundtrack was released the day of the series' premiere.

Episodes

Shorts

Theme Song Takeover 
As part of a promotional campaign, Disney Channel began airing the Disney Theme Song Takeover wherein supporting characters from different shows performed the theme song to the series they were in.

Chibi Tiny Tales 
Chibi Tiny Tales is a series of shorts that depict characters from various Disney Channel properties in chibi-style animation. In September 2022, the series began releasing shorts based around Hamster & Gretel.

Release 
Hamster & Gretel premiered on Disney Channel on August 12, 2022. The first five episodes of the series were added to Disney+ on August 17, resulting in episodes 3-5 being released prior to their televised premieres. Similarly, episodes 11-15 were added to Disney+ on February 8, 2023, resulting in episode 15 being released prior to its televised premiere later that week.

Reception

Critical reception 
Brandon Zachary of CBR.com stated, "Hamster & Gretel delivers a new take on a lot of well-worn genres from Disney Animation. It's quietly a solid parody of superhero narratives, with one of the minds behind Phineas and Ferb helping usher in a new generation of bizarre heroes and villains. It's a down-to-earth cartoon sitcom focusing on a multicultural family dealing with some absurd situations. It's also a show where a hamster sometimes punches adults into submission -- a very silly direction that was very much by design."

Tony Betti of LaughingPlace.com gave Hamster & Gretel a grade of 4 out of 5 stars, saying, "At only a few episodes in so far, the show has already started building a universe that is sure to become lush and full of details and recurring characters that we will likely see throughout. While the show already has a built-in villain-of-the-week premise, the setup has also been built to include overarching enemies and even non-threatening characters that we’ll see again and again. Namely cousin Fred, and Kevin’s crush. We also see hints at how expansive Kevin and Gretel’s family is, all of which will likely come into play in the weeks and months ahead, giving fans a world in which they can immerse themselves into when viewing and will likely keep them coming back for more. However, they need to figure out the target audience where those fans will come from first. Once they do, (and they still have time) it will be solid programming."

Diondra Brown of Common Sense Media gave the series a grade of 3 out of 5 stars and praised the depiction of positive messages and role models, stating the characters promote self authenticity, friendship, and helpfulness, while noting the diverse representations across the racial and religious backgrounds of different characters.

Notes

References

External links 
 
 

2020s American animated comedy television series
2020s American animated television series
2022 American television series debuts
American children's animated action television series
American children's animated adventure television series
American children's animated comedy television series
American children's animated musical television series
American children's animated superhero television series
American flash animated television series
Disney Channel original programming
Television series by Disney Television Animation
Animated television series about children
Animated television series about families
Animated television series about mammals
Animated superheroine television shows
Hispanic and Latino American television
Venezuela in fiction
English-language television shows